"May the Force Be with You" is an episode of the BBC sitcom Only Fools and Horses. It was the fifth episode of series 3, and was first screened on 8 December 1983. In the episode, the despised DCI Roy Slater returns to Peckham and arrests the Trotters for stealing a microwave.

Synopsis
Roy Slater, a duplicitous, mean-spirited police officer and hated ex-schoolmate of Del Boy, has returned to Peckham, where he has been tasked with tracking down a stolen microwave. He meets Trigger and Boycie – both uncomfortable by his return – in the Nag's Head, and announces that he has recently been promoted to Detective Inspector. He begins talking to Rodney, who is unaware that Slater is a police officer, and tells him that he is an old friend of Del's.

Rodney invites Slater back to Nelson Mandela House to reunite with Del, to Del's shock. After spotting a suspicious microwave in the Trotters' flat, Slater arrests Del, Rodney and Grandad. At the police station, Slater interrogates the trio about where, and from whom, they acquired the microwave. In an improvised story, they state that it belonged to an unidentified deaf man in the market who dropped it. Del, Rodney, and Grandad are interviewed separately, giving vastly differing descriptions of the man in the market, disagreeing on height, age and ethnic group.

When Slater briefly leaves for the canteen, his partner, PC Terry Hoskins (whose mother, it emerges, has recently bought a gas fire from Del), advises Del to tell Slater the truth about the microwave. Slater returns with Rodney's criminal file for possession of cannabis, and makes a veiled threat that drugs may be planted on Rodney, meaning both he and Del would go to prison, leaving Grandad alone and at-risk on the estate. Del refuses to give the name of the person who stole the microwave until Slater prepares to have the charge sheets typed up, whereupon Del offers Slater the name of the thief, provided that he, Rodney, and Grandad are granted immunity from prosecution in writing and released without charge. Realising how much leverage being an informant would give him over Del in future, Slater happily agrees.

With all the paperwork drawn up and signed by the Superintendent, Rodney and Grandad are led back into the interview room to see a crestfallen Del as he prepares to sign it. He tells them of his predicament, explaining he has no choice but to co-operate, with he and Rodney facing the possibility of long prison sentences and Grandad being uncared for on the estate. He signs it and is asked by Slater: "Who nicked the microwave?" After further reassurances of his immunity from prosecution, Del confesses that he himself was the thief and confidently holds up his immunity document at a speechless Slater.

Episode cast

First appearances 
 Jim Broadbent as Roy Slater

Notes 
 The title of the episode comes from a line in Star Wars: May the Force be with you.

Story arc
 Slater's wife (who is revealed to be Raquel) is mentioned here, but is not named and does not appear until "Dates". Slater and Hoskins both re-appear in "To Hull and Back", and Slater makes a third and final appearance in "The Class of '62".

External links
 
 

1983 British television episodes
Only Fools and Horses (series 3) episodes
Works about police officers